Lashly Glacier is a short, broad glacier in Oates Land, Antarctica, lying between the Lashly Mountains on the west and Tabular Mountain and Mount Feather on the east, flowing south into The Portal, in Victoria Land. It was so named by the New Zealand party of the Commonwealth Trans-Antarctic Expedition (1956–58) for its proximity to the Lashly Mountains.

References

Glaciers of Oates Land